Ole Mikkelsen (born April 8, 1959 in Los Angeles, California) is a Norwegian-born American  businessman and former soccer manager and forward. He played in both the North American Soccer League, Major Indoor Soccer League and Western Soccer Alliance during his career. He was  formerly the head coach with the Ventura County Fusion and currently Vice President of Information Technology at Mentor Corporation.

Mikkelsen attended UCLA where he majored in Scandinavian languages and played on the men's soccer team from 1977 to 1980. He was a 1978 First Team All American soccer player.  In 1980, he played for Maccabee Athletic Club.  In 1981, the Washington Diplomats selected Mikkelsen in the first round (13th overall) of the North American Soccer League draft.  The Diplomats folded at the end of the season and in October 1981, the Fort Lauderdale Strikers selected Mikkelsen in the dispersal draft. The Strikers released Mikkelsen during the preseason and he signed with the San Jose Earthquakes for the 1982 season.  He then moved to the Los Angeles Lazers of the Major Indoor Soccer League for two seasons.  In 1987, he played for the Los Angeles Heat of the Western Soccer Alliance.

He later worked for Amgen before joining Mentor Corporation where he is the Vice President of Information Technology.  In 2008, he replaced Rudy Ybarra as the assistant coach with the Ventura County Fusion of the Premier Development League.

He is a member of the 2022 class of the UCLA Athletics Hall of Fame.

References

External links
 NASL/MISL stats

1959 births
Living people
American soccer coaches
American soccer players
Los Angeles Heat players
Los Angeles Lazers players
North American Soccer League (1968–1984) players
Major Indoor Soccer League (1978–1992) players
San Jose Earthquakes (1974–1988) players
UCLA Bruins men's soccer players
Washington Diplomats (NASL) players
Western Soccer Alliance players
All-American men's college soccer players
Association football forwards